was a village located in Senboku District, Akita Prefecture, Japan.

In 2003, the village had an estimated population of 4,529 and a density of 45.82 persons per km². The total area was 98.85 km².

On March 22, 2005, Nangai, along with the city of Ōmagari; and the towns of Kamioka, Kyōwa, Nakasen, Nishisenboku, Ōta and Semboku (all from Senboku District), merged to create the city of Daisen.

External links 
  

Dissolved municipalities of Akita Prefecture
Daisen, Akita